Time Chasers (originally released as Tangents) is a 1994 science fiction film directed by David Giancola and starring Matthew Bruch, George Woodard, and Bonnie Pritchard.  The film premiered in Rutland, Vermont on March 16, 1994 to three invitation-only showings, and in open release in Rutland theatres the next day. The film follows the adventures of an amateur inventor who goes through time with his female accomplice to stop an evil megacorporation intent on changing history for profit.  The film was lampooned on Mystery Science Theater 3000 in 1997, and by Rifftrax in a live event broadcast on May 5, 2016.

Plot
Physics teacher and amateur pilot Nick Miller (Matthew Bruch) has finally completed his quest of enabling time travel, via a Commodore 64 and his small airplane.  After being inspired by a television commercial for GenCorp, he uses a ruse to bring out both a GenCorp executive and a reporter from a local paper.  To Nick's surprise, the reporter is Lisa Hansen (Bonnie Pritchard), an old high school flame.  One trip to 2041 later and Gencorp's executive, Matthew Paul (Peter Harrington), quickly arranges Nick a meeting with CEO J.K. Robertson (George Woodard).  Impressed by the potential of time travel, Robertson offers Nick a licensing agreement on the technology.

The following week, Nick and Lisa meet at the supermarket and go on a date to the 1950s.  However, another trip to 2041 reveals that GenCorp abused Nick's time travel technology, creating a dystopian future. In an attempt to tell J.K. about how GenCorp inadvertently ruined the future. J.K. dismisses the eventuality, and states that there's enough time to worry about how to fix it before it happens. J.K. sees Nick as a threat to GenCorp, and due to the association with the U.S. Government, considers Nick's actions as treason. Nick and Lisa escape GenCorp and spend the remainder of the film trying to reverse the damage to the future. When J.K. finds out about this, he and Matt try to shoot down Nick's plane, killing Lisa in the process while Nick jumps out before the plane crashes. This ultimately culminates in a fight in 1777 during the American Revolution, the deaths of the present Nick and Robertson, and the destruction of the time machine before the original demo, thus ensuring that the majority of the film's events never happen in the first place.  The film ends with the now current Nick (now aware of the danger of his time machine) sabotaging his demonstration, and doing a pitch of how an elderly skydiver would be a better ad campaign for J.K.'s company. Furious about being misled, J.K. fires Matt. Nick deletes the data that makes time travel possible. At the end of the film, Nick talks to Lisa in the supermarket as he did in the previous timeline.

Cast

 Matthew Bruch as Nick Miller
 Bonnie Pritchard as Lisa Henson
 Peter Harrington as Matthew Paul
 George Woodard as J.K. Robertson
 Jason Smiley as Future Inhabitant
 Cyrus Rodgers as Future Inhabitant

Production 

Time Chasers was written and directed by David Giancola, under the title Tangents. It was promoted as the first feature film directed, written, and produced in Vermont.

The production was shot in the Rutland, Vermont area during the summer of 1990, though it has a distinctive assortment of mid-1980s cultural artifacts, sets, and props. It was made on a $150,000 budget by 24 year old director David Giancola and his company Edgewood Studios.

Scenes of the dystopic future were filmed at the Howe Center which Giancola's family was then renovating. A few scenes were shot in the Burlington area; the undisturbed future were shot by the Papa Gino's in what was then the Burlington Square Mall and the 1950s diner was Libby's Blue Line Diner (now Athens Diner) by I-89 Exit 16.

In 2004, when asked if he was considering a sequel, Giancola said: "We don't have any plans for a sequel, there have been so many time travel films since covering the same material, I don't feel I have anything new to add."

Release
To make the title of the movie more comprehensible in the Asian markets, the title of the movie was changed to Time Chasers, from Tangents.

In 2008, a new "Special Anniversary Edition" of the film was released with deleted scenes, new audio commentary and in depth humorous interviews, including "Memories In Time" by filmmaker Andrew Gannon.

Reception
In 1994, Time Chasers won the first-place Gold Award in the independent category at the WorldFest-Houston International Film Festival.

Mystery Science Theater 3000
The film initially lost money, but licensing fees for its 1997 Mystery Science Theater 3000 appearance took its earnings out of the red. For the showing on MST3K, the cast and crew had a reunion party to view the lampooning. MST3K star Michael J. Nelson claims that some at the party were not happy at the mocking, in particular Peter Harrington. However, director Giancola said they all "laughed their asses off," but also admitted that some people at the time "took it a bit too seriously." Harrington was originally planned to appear in the episode as a guest but was unable to attend due to scheduling conflicts.

References

External links 
 

1994 science fiction films
1994 films
American science fiction films
American aviation films
1990s English-language films
American independent films
Rutland, Vermont
Films set in 1777
Films set in 1957
Films set in 2041
Films set in the future
Films about time travel
Films shot in Vermont
1994 independent films
1990s rediscovered films
Films set in the 1950s
Films set in the 2040s
Rediscovered American films
1990s American films